Desert Vengeance is a 1931 American western film directed by Louis King and starring Buck Jones, Barbara Bedford and Douglas Gilmore. It was produced and distributed by Columbia Pictures.

Cast
 Buck Jones as Jim Cardew (as Charles 'Buck' Jones)
 Barbara Bedford as Anne Dixon
 Douglas Gilmore as Hugh Dixon
 Ed Brady as Beaver
 Albert J. Smith as McBride (as Al Smith)
 Bob Fleming as Winnipeg - McBride Rider
 Slim Whitaker as Whiskey - Cardew Rider
 Chuck Baldra as Chuck - Cardew Rider
 Barney Beasley as Cardew Rider
 Charles Brinley as Poker Game Spectator
 Buck Connors as The Parson
 Joseph W. Girard as Ship's Captain
 Gilbert Holmes as Alabam - Cardew Rider
 Russell Hopton as Inspector
 Arthur Millett as Train Conductor
 Art Mix as McBride Rider
 Bill Nestell as Cardew Rider
 Bill Patton as Bill - McBride Rider
 Evelyn Selbie as Indian Woman
 Blackjack Ward as Jack - McBride Rider
 Blue Washington as Train Porter

References

Bibliography
 Fetrow, Alan G. . Sound films, 1927-1939: a United States Filmography. McFarland, 1992.
 Pitts, Michael R. Western Movies: A Guide to 5,105 Feature Films. McFarland, 2012.

External links
 

1931 films
1931 Western (genre) films
American Western (genre) films
Films directed by Louis King
Columbia Pictures films
American black-and-white films
1930s English-language films
1930s American films